Fifth Church of Christ, Scientist may refer to:

 Fifth Church of Christ Scientist (Denver, Colorado), a Denver Landmark
 Fifth Church of Christ, Scientist (New York, New York)
 Fifth Church of Christ, Scientist (Seattle, Washington)